Masaguara is a municipality in the Honduran department of Intibucá.

Demographics
At the time of the 2013 Honduras census, Masaguara municipality had a population of 15,892. Of these, 88.16% were Mestizo, 9.87% Indigenous (9.65% Lenca), 1.72% White, 0.23% Black or Afro-Honduran and 0.02% others.

References

Municipalities of the Intibucá Department